Shenoy Nagar Metro station is a Metro railway station on Line 2 of the Chennai Metro. The station is among the underground stations along corridor II of the Chennai Metro, Chennai Central–St. Thomas Mount stretch, inaugurated on 14 May 2017. The station will serve the neighbourhoods of Shenoy Nagar and Aminjikarai.

History

Construction

The station
The station has four entry and exit points.

Structure

Station layout

Facilities
List of available ATM at Shenoy Nagar metro station are

Connections

Entry/Exit

See also

 Shenoy Nagar
 List of Chennai metro stations
 Chennai Metro
 Railway stations in Chennai
 Chennai Mass Rapid Transit System
 Chennai Monorail
 Chennai Suburban Railway
 Transport in Chennai
 Urban rail transit in India
 List of metro systems

References

External links
 

 UrbanRail.Net – descriptions of all metro systems in the world, each with a schematic map showing all stations.

Chennai Metro stations
Railway stations in Chennai